Liam Grimwood is an English archer who won a gold medal at the 2010 Commonwealth Games in Delhi.

References

Year of birth missing (living people)
Living people
English male archers
Commonwealth Games medallists in archery
Commonwealth Games gold medallists for England
Archers at the 2010 Commonwealth Games
Medallists at the 2010 Commonwealth Games